The Men's Greco-Roman 80 kg competition at the 2017 European Wrestling Championships was held in Novi Sad, Serbia on May 7, 2017.

Medalists

Results
Legend
F — Won by fall

Final

Top half

Bottom half

Repechage

References
Draw
Results

Men's greco-roman 80 kg